Jewish Public Library may refer to:
Jewish Public Library (Montreal)
Jewish Public Library (Toronto)